Joseph Clifford (Cliff) McIsaac, (August 30, 1930 – July 25, 2006) was a politician, public servant and veterinarian.

Born and raised in Prince Edward Island, McIsaac graduated from the Truro Agricultural College in 1950 and the Ontario Veterinary College in 1955 moving then to Saskatchewan to establish his practice.

McIsaac entered politics in the province and was elected to the Saskatchewan legislature in the 1964 provincial election as the Liberal MLA for Wilkie. He was appointed by Premier Ross Thatcher as Minister of Municipal Affairs from 1965 until 1971 and then as Minister of Education in the provincial cabinet from 1967 until the government's defeat in the 1971 provincial election. He was elected to the House of Commons of Canada in the 1974 federal election for the riding of Battleford—Kindersley and sat in the federal Liberal caucus of Pierre Trudeau serving as a parliamentary secretary and then Government Whip. He was defeated in the 1979 federal election and again in 1980. After leaving politics he served as a Commissioner of the Canadian Dairy Commission and Chairman of the National Farm Products Marketing Council.

References

External links
 

1930 births
2006 deaths
Members of the Executive Council of Saskatchewan
Liberal Party of Canada MPs
Saskatchewan Liberal Party MLAs
Members of the House of Commons of Canada from Saskatchewan
Canadian veterinarians
Male veterinarians